The Pittsburgh Penguins are a team in the National Hockey League (NHL).

History
Joe Daley became the first of 20 players selected by the Penguins in the 1967 NHL Expansion Draft on June 6, 1967. The next day, the Penguins participated in their first amateur draft, where they selected Steve Rexe second overall.

The Penguins obtained the first-overall pick in 1984, and selected Mario Lemieux from the Laval Voisins of the Quebec Major Junior Hockey League (QMJHL). Lemieux won the Calder Memorial Trophy as the NHL's best rookie in 1985. He went on to win six Art Ross trophies as the NHL's leading scorer, captained the team to Stanley Cup championships in 1991 and 1992, and was inducted into the Hockey Hall of Fame in 1997 following his first retirement. He later came back to play in another five seasons for the Penguins, and in 1999, became chairman and co-owner of the team. As owner, Lemieux negotiated an agreement to construct a new arena, the Consol Energy Center, ensuring the team's future in Pittsburgh. After the Penguins' 2009 Stanley Cup victory, Lemieux became the first person to win a Stanley Cup as both a player and an owner.

In 1990, the Penguins drafted Czechoslovakian Jaromír Jágr with the fifth overall pick. Following the Velvet Revolution of 1989, Jagr was the first Czechoslovak to attend the NHL Draft with the government's permission, becoming the first drafted without having to defect to the West. Jagr was also the first European drafted in the first round by the Penguins after selecting only Canadians in their first 23 years. He was the first of four consecutive first round Europeans, and eight in ten years from 1990 to 1999. That draft was also notable in being the first time that less than half of Pittsburgh's picks were used on players born in Canada and the first time that a majority of their selections did not hail from Canada (6 players came from the United States, 4 from Canada).

Artem Kopot, an up-and-coming Russian defenseman with the Soviet under-18 team who had also played 28 games with his hometown Traktor Chelyabinsk in 1991–92, was the first Russian player to be drafted by the Penguins, selected in the sixth round, 139th overall, of the 1992 NHL Entry Draft. Less than a month after being selected by the Penguins and five days before his 20th birthday, Kopot was involved in a fatal one-car accident in his hometown of Chelyabinsk. Kopot was the only person in the vehicle.

Brooks Orpik was the first American drafted by the Penguins in the first round when he was selected in 2000 from Boston College. Along with Ryan Whitney in 2002 and Beau Bennett in 2010, the Penguins have only selected three Americans in the first round as of 2021.

The Penguins traded for the first overall pick for 2003, which they used to select goaltender Marc-Andre Fleury. Fleury was the third goaltender selected first overall behind Michel Plasse and Rick DiPietro. Pittsburgh's first-round selection, second overall, in 2004, Evgeni Malkin, was the Penguins' second Calder Trophy winner. The Penguins earned another first overall selection in 2005 and selected Sidney Crosby in what was nicknamed the "Sidney Crosby Sweepstakes."

1967 NHL Expansion Draft selections

Pittsburgh's first players were selected from the Original Six Teams

NHL draft selections

Note: Statistics listed include totals from all teams in the National Hockey League.
Note: Stats current as of July 1, 2021.

¿ Played in the WHA.

Draftees by nationality

Notes
 The Penguins first-round pick in 1969 was traded to the Boston Bruins.
 The Penguins first-round pick in 1971 was traded to the St. Louis Blues.
 The Penguins first-round pick in 1972 was traded to the Minnesota North Stars.
 The Penguins first-round pick in 1977 was traded to the Toronto Maple Leafs.
 The Penguins first-round pick in 1978 was traded to the Philadelphia Flyers.
 The Penguins first-round pick in 1979 was traded to the Washington Capitals.
 The Penguins first-round pick in 1981 was traded to the Montreal Canadiens.
 The Penguins obtained the 9th overall pick in 1984 from the Winnipeg Jets.
 The Penguins obtained the 16th overall pick in 1984 from the Philadelphia Flyers.
 The Penguins obtained the 1st overall pick in 2003 from the Florida Panthers.
 The Penguins first-round pick in 2008 was traded to the Atlanta Thrashers.
 The Penguins obtained the 8th overall pick in 2012 from the Carolina Hurricanes.
 The Penguins first-round pick in 2013 was traded to the Calgary Flames.
 The Penguins first-round pick in 2015 was traded to the Edmonton Oilers.
 The Penguins first-round pick in 2016 was traded to the Toronto Maple Leafs.
 The Penguins first-round pick in 2017 was traded to the St. Louis Blues.
 The Penguins first-round pick in 2018 was traded to the Ottawa Senators.

References
Draft order

Other

 
draft picks
Pittsburgh Penguins